Vadakkumnathan Temple is an ancient Hindu temple dedicated to Shiva at city of Thrissur, of Kerala state in India. This temple is a classical example of the architectural style of Kerala and has one monumental tower on each of the four sides in addition to a kuttambalam. Mural paintings  depicting various scenes from the Mahabharata can be seen inside the temple. The shrines and the Kuttambalam display vignettes carved in wood. The temple, along with the mural paintings, has been declared as a National Monument by India under the AMASR Act. According to popular local lore, this is the first temple built by Parasurama, the sixth avatara of Vishnu. Thekkinkadu Maidan, encircling the Vadakkumnathan Temple, is the main venue of the renowned Thrissur Pooram festival.

In the year 2012 the Archaeological Survey of India (ASI) has recommended 14 sites, including Vadakkumnathan Temple and palaces, from Kerala to include in the list of UNESCO World Heritage Sites. The temple is also the first one among the 108 Shiva Temples in ancient Kerala, established by Parasurama.

Legend
Legends regarding the origins of the Vadakkumnathan Temple are briefly narrated in the Brahmanda Purana and these legends are referenced in some other works as well. Though these accounts differ with respect to certain details, they are all in agreement regarding the central theme that the temple was founded by Parashurama. According to lore, Parashurama exterminated Kshatriyas in twenty-one cycles. In order to cleanse himself of the negative karma of these deeds he performed a yajna at the end of which he gave away all the land to Brahmins as dakshina. He wanted to retire to a new land to perform meditative penance (tapasya) and thus requested the Lord of the oceans Varuna to bring forth a new piece of land from the waters.

According to another version, some sages approached him at the end of the yajna and requested him to give them some secluded land. Parashurama then requested Varuna on their behalf. Varuna gave him a winnow (surpa) and asked him to hurl it into the sea; as he did so, a large area of land was brought from the sea; this region of land that arose from the sea become Kerala. It was then known by the name "Surparaka", from the word, "Surpa" meaning winnow.

According to some other accounts, Varuna asked Parashurama to hurl his axe into the sea. Parashurama now wanted to consecrate this new land. So he went to Mount Kailasa to his guru, Lord Shiva and requested him to take abode in Kerala and thereby bless the region. Shri Shiva accompanied by his wife Parvati, his sons Ganesha and Subrahmanya and his parashadas went along with Parashurama, to oblige his disciple. Shiva stopped at a spot, which is now Thrissur, for his seat. Later he and his party disappeared and Parashurama saw a bright and radiant Shiva lingam (non-anthropomorphic icon of Shiva) at the foot of a huge banyan tree. This place where Shiva manifested his presence as a lingam is known in Sanskrit as the Sri Moola Sthana.

For sometime, the lingam remained at Sri Moola Sthana at the foot of a huge banyan tree. The ruler of Cochin Kingdom then decided to shift the lingam to a more appropriate place and construct a temple around it. Arrangements were soon made for the new installation. But there was an initial difficulty. The lingam could not be removed without cutting off a large part of the banyan tree. This created the risk of damaging the lingam due to falling branches. As the ruler and the others remained confounded, the Yogatirippadu came forward with a solution. He lay over the lingam so as to cover it completely with his body and asked the men to cut the tree. The cutting began and to everyone's astonishment, not a single branch of the tree fell anywhere near the deity. The deity was moved according to prescribed rituals and installed in the new place where it remains to this day. Subsequently, a temple was built around the deity, according to the rules specified in the Shastras.

History

The temple was built at the time of Perumthachan from Parayi petta panthirukulam. It is said that Perumthachan lived during the second century; so the Koothambalam may be more than 1,600 years old. According to Malayalam historian V. V. K. Valath, the temple was a pre-Dravidian Kavu (shrine). In the early days, Paramekkavu Bhagavathi was also situated inside the Vadakkunnathan temple. Subsequently, a new temple was built outside and the idol of the goddess was moved to that location. For comparison, Koodalmanikyam Temple, Kodungallur Bhagavathy Temple and Ammathiruvadi Temple, Urakam are older than the Vadakkunnathan temple, according to temple documents.
Some suggest that there have also been influences from Buddhist and Jain temples.

Yogiatiripppads
The Nambudiris who were entrusted with looking after temple affairs were called Yogiatiripppads. When Nambudiris gained control of the region, the temple also came under their domain. The Yogiatiripppads were elected from Thrissur desam. Prior to Sakthan Thampuran's reign, the Yogiatiripppad system declined. Later, the Maharaja of Cochin gained presiding authority over the temple.

Adi Shankara
Adi Shankara is believed to have been born (788 AD) to Shivaguru and Aryamba of Kalady consequent to their prayers to lord  Vadakkumnathan, as amsavatara of Shiva. The couple devoutly prayed for 41 days at the temple. Legend has it that Shiva appeared to the couple in their dreams and offered them a choice. They could have either a mediocre son who would live a long life or an extraordinary son who would die early. Both Shivaguru and Aryamba chose the latter. In honour of Shiva, they named their son Shankara. According to legend, Adi Shankara attained videha mukti ("freedom from embodiment") at the Vadakkunnathan temple. One narrative as expounded by the Keraliya Shankaravijaya, identifies the temple as his place of death. He also established four Mutts at Thrissur, famously known as Edayil Madhom, Naduvil Madhom, Thekke Madhom and  Vadakke Madhom

Invasion of Tipu Sultan
During the invasion of Tipu Sultan, the temple was not attacked by Tipu's Army. Even though Tipu Sultan destroyed many temples in Thrissur district at that time, he never touched Vadakkumnathan Temple. According to historical accounts, when Tipu Sultan was marching towards the Travancore lines, known locally as Nedumkotta, he had a short stay at Thrissur city from 14 to 29 December 1789. In order to feed his Army, he had borrowed cooking vessels from Vadakkumnathan Temple. Before leaving Thrissur city, he not only returned the vessels, but presented the temple with a large bronze lamp.

Zamorin of Calicut
During 1750 to 1762, the temple affairs were conducted by Zamorin of Calicut who attacked Thrissur city and took control of the temple and the city. In 1762 with the help of Kingdom of Travancore, Maharaja of Cochin regained control over Thrissur city and the temple.

Sakthan Thampuran
When Sakthan Thampuran (1751–1805), ascended the throne of Kingdom of Cochin, he changed the capital of Kingdom of Cochin from Thripunithura to Thrissur city as the King had a personal relationship with Vadakkumnathan Temple. He later cleared the teak forest around the temple and introduced the famous Thrissur Pooram festival. The King's personal interest in the temple also changed the fortune of the city.

Structure
Inside this fortification, there are four gopurams facing four cardinal directions. Between the inner temple and the outer walls, there is a spacious compound, the entrance to which is through gopurams. Of these, the gopurams on the south and north are not open to the public. The public enter either through the east or west gopuram. The inner temple is separated from the outer temple by a broad circular granite wall enclosing a broad corridor called Chuttambalam. Entrance into the inner temple is through a passage through the corridor.

Deities
. 

The main deity of this temple,
Lord Shiva, is worshipped in the form of a huge lingam, which is covered by a mound of ghee, formed by the daily abhishekam (ablution) with ghee over the years. A devotee looking into the sanctum can now see only a  mound of ghee embellished with thirteen cascading crescents of gold and three serpent hoods on top. According to traditional belief, this represents the snow-clad Mount Kailash, the abode of Shiva. This is the only temple where the lingam is not visible. It is said that the ghee offered here for centuries does not have any foul odour and it does not melt even during summer. But even then, it breaks in parts during some periods. Such periods are considered to be beneficial or harmful depending upon the part and area of the breaking.

In the outer temple, there are shrines for Krishna (Gosala Krishna; or  Gopala Krishna; Krishna as a cowherd), Shiva's bull vahana (vehicle) Nandikeswara, Parashurama, Simhodara, Ayyappa (Shiva's son, especially venerated in Kerala), Vettekkaran (Shiva as a hunter), Serpent deities and Adi Shankara. Also, there are special spots where people worship Kashi Vishwanatha, Nataraja at Chidambaram, Ramanathaswamy at Rameswaram, Goddess Bhadrakali at Kodungallur Temple, Lord Bharata at Koodalmanikyam Temple in Irinjalakuda and Goddess Ammathiruvadi in Urakam. Outside the main temple, there are shrines for Lord Subrahmanya and Lord Ganapathi. Located on the verandah of the Nalambalam is a large white bull Nandikeswara. It is in the northern side that the main sanctum, a circular structure with Shiva facing west and behind him, Parvati facing east, denoting their combined form Ardhanarishvara, is made. The two-storied rectangular shrine of the god Rama facing west is located in the south. Between these two sanctums (srikovils) stands a third one, circular and double-storied in shape, which is dedicated to Shankaranarayana, the combined form of Shiva and Vishnu, facing west. There are mukhamandapams (halls) in front of all the three central shrines. It is said that Hanuman resides in the mandapam in front of Rama's sanctum. The two important murals in the temple, Vasukisayana and Nrithanatha (Nataraja), are worshipped regularly. Ganesha shrine is positioned facing the temple kitchen. The offering of Appam (sweetened rice cake fried in ghee) to him is one of the most important offerings at the temple. Propitiating him here is believed to be a path to prosperity and wealth.

Architecture

Murals
The temple is famous for the rarity of the temple murals, of which the Vasukishayana and Nrithanatha murals are of great importance and are worshipped daily. The temple also houses a museum of ancient wall paintings, wood carvings and art pieces of ancient times. A study done by Archaeological Survey of India on two paintings in the temple has revealed that it is 350 years old. These two rare paintings were a reclining Shiva and a Nataraja with 20 arms.

Koothambalam
The temple theatre, known as Koothambalam, has four magnificent gateways called Gopurams and the lofty masonry wall around the temple quadrangle are imposing pieces of craftsmanship and skill. The Koothambalam is used for staging Koothu, Nangyar Koothu and Koodiyattam, an ancient ritualistic art forms of Central Kerala. According to folk lore, before the new Koothambalam was built, there used to be an old and dilapidated structure. The then Diwan T. Sankunni Menon ordered to demolish the structure and construct a new Koothambalam. He gave this task to Velanezhy Nambudiri, a famous Thachushasthranjan or master craftsman. He prepared a mental sketch and built a beautiful Koothambalam there. Velanezhy Illom is in Venganellur Gramam, Chelakkara town.

Festivals

Maha Shivaratri
Maha Shivaratri is the main festival which is celebrated in the temple. Cultural and musical programmes are held in the temple premises. Around one lakh temple lamps (hundred thousand)are lighted in the festival. The idol of Vadakkumnatha is not taken out for procession. On this day, there will he continuous abhishekam with ghee and tender coconut. The temple is not closed in the night, and there will be special poojas with abhishekam on the day. 

.

Aanayoottu
The Aanayoottu of feeding of elephants, is the second biggest festival held in the temple. The devotees refer to elephants as Lord Ganesh's incarnation. The festival falls on the first day of the month of Karkkidakam (timed against the Malayalam calendar), which coincides with the month of July. It has been the regular annual practice at the temple for the last 20 years to conduct a large-scale Ashta Dravya Maha Ganapathy Havana and Aanayoottu on the first day of the Karkidakom month of the Malayalam calendar. It involves a number of unadorned elephants being positioned amid a multitude of people for being worshipped and fed. A large number of people throng the temple to feed the elephants. Gajapooja also is conducted once every four years.

Thrissur Pooram
Thrissur Pooram is called the mother of all Poorams in Kerala. In Malayalam it's called "poorangalude pooram". This is conducted in the Malayalam month of Medam. The deities from Parmekavu and Thiruvambady temple along with other small poorams come engage in festivities in front of Vadakkumanathan. It's a 36 long hour festival which attracts thousands of enthusiasts from all over the state as well as visitors from other regions and abroad. The main attractions of Pooram are Madathilavaravu panchavadhyam, Elanjithara melam, Kudamattam and Vedikettu. The festival is a visual feast for all those who enjoy it.

See also
 108 Shiva Temples
 Temples of Kerala
 Hindu temples in Thrissur Rural

References

108 Shiva Temples
Shiva temples in Kerala
Hindu temples in Thrissur
Tourist attractions in Thrissur
UNESCO Asia-Pacific Heritage Awards winners
Monuments of National Importance in Kerala
Thrissur Pooram